In physics, the Laplace expansion of potentials that are directly proportional to the inverse of the distance, such as Newton's gravitational potential or Coulomb's electrostatic potential, expresses them in terms of the spherical Legendre polynomials. In quantum mechanical calculations on atoms the expansion is used in the evaluation of integrals of the inter-electronic repulsion.

The Laplace expansion  is in fact the expansion of the inverse distance between two points.

Here  has the spherical polar coordinates  and  has  with homogeneous polynomials of degree . Further r< is min(r, r′) and r> is max(r, r′). The function  is a normalized spherical harmonic function.  The expansion takes a simpler form when written in terms of solid harmonics,

Derivation
The derivation of this expansion is simple. By the law of cosines,

We find here the generating function of the Legendre polynomials  :

Use of the spherical harmonic addition theorem 

gives the desired result.

Neumann Expansion

References

 Griffiths, David J. (David Jeffery). Introduction to Electrodynamics. Englewood Cliffs, N.J.: Prentice-Hall, 1981. 

Potential theory
Atomic physics
Rotational symmetry